Fashion Fair is a medium-sized, enclosed shopping mall in Fresno, California, anchored by two Macy's stores, JCPenney, and Forever 21. Originally opened in 1970, Fashion Fair was expanded in 1983 (to accommodate Macy's and a new food court) and in 2005 (with the addition of an outdoor lifestyle wing). It competes with The Shops at River Park and Fig Garden Village, two outdoor shopping centers in the city of Fresno.

History
The  mall was built in 1970 by the MacDonald Group and was sold in 1987. The mall originally opened with Gottschalks, J. C. Penney, and Weinstock's; Macy's joined the roster in 1983.

In 1996, Weinstock's parent company, Broadway Department Stores, merged with its competitor, Federated Department Stores. While most of Broadway's stores were converted to the Macy's nameplate, Weinstock's stores in Fresno and Modesto were traded to Gottschalks. This allowed Gottschalks to take over the larger Weinstock's buildings, while Macy's converted the original Gottschalks stores into separate Macy's Men's & Children's stores. Gottschalks filed for bankruptcy in 2009 and sold its lease to Forever 21. In 2019, Macy's relocated the children's department back to the original Macy's building to make room for the addition of Macy's Backstage. 

After an extensive remodel, Forever 21 opened on April 1, 2011; this was the largest Forever 21 built in the United States at 164,052 square feet. Approximately one year after opening, the store downsized and took the third level out of service. In Spring 2019 amid company restructuring, the store downsized again leaving only the first floor in use. The 2nd level partially reopened on August 30, 2019, however, was re-closed by October 24, 2019 leaving only the first floor in use. Forever 21 filed for Chapter 11 Bankruptcy on September 29, 2019. On October 1, 2019, this location was placed on the initial list of stores set to close by the end of the year. By October 31, 2019, the store was removed from the list of locations to close. 

In 2005, construction on a 94,000 square-foot expansion commenced. Dubbed The Village at Fashion Fair, the open-air wing features upscale retailers including Charming Charlie, Lucky Brand Jeans, LUSH Cosmetics, Michael Kors, and Sephora;  alongside The Cheesecake Factory and a Fleming's steakhouse.

The Village has experienced significant turnover since it opened, with major retailers Urban Outfitters, Anthropologie, and Z Gallerie (among others) exiting the property after less than 10 years in business. The former Urban Outfitters was replaced with an Ulta Beauty store in 2018, which was joined by Fresno's second H&M store later in the year. Charming Charlie, which originally replaced Z Gallerie, closed in 2019, and was replaced with a Five Below which opened September 27, 2019. However, Charming Charlie returned to the mall in 2021 as part of a revival of the chain, replacing a former Guess clothing store in The Village, before closing again the next year.

The mall added a forest-themed play area in 2008.

A van selling official Hello Kitty merchandise has stopped at Fashion Fair Mall many times, drawing thousands.

The mall lost several tenants as a result of the COVID-19 Pandemic, including Starbucks Coffee, New York & Company, Justice, Francesca's, Cinnabon, Auntie Anne's, Chipotle, Mrs. Fields, and Call it Spring.

Anchor stores

Former anchors
Weinstock's (Opened 1970, closed 1996 due to Broadway-Federated merger)
Gottschalks (Opened 1970, moved to former Weinstock's in 1996, closed 2009 due to company liquidation)
Love Culture (Opened 2012 in former Forever 21 space, closed 2018, replaced by H&M)

See also
Fulton Mall
The Shops at River Park

References

External links
Fashion Fair official website at fashionfairmall.com

Macerich
Buildings and structures in Fresno, California
Shopping malls in Fresno County, California
Tourist attractions in Fresno, California
Shopping malls established in 1970